The Chastye Islands (Ostrova Chastye) is an island group in the southern end of the Sea of Okhotsk. It is located in Tatar Strait, between the mainland shore and the western coast of Sakhalin. Although there are some settlements on the adjacent coast, the Chastye Islands are uninhabited.

Administratively the Chastye Islands belong to the Khabarovsk Krai of the Russian Federation.

Islands
Pilamif Island (Остров Пиламиф)  is the largest island of the Chastye group. It is 5 km long and about 2 km wide. Pilamif is surrounded by a number of smaller islands, the most important of which are:
Tyurmus  and Metmus (or Khagemif)  islands lie roughly 5 km north of Pilamif.
Giamif  lies about 7 km to the northwest of Pilamif. 
Bolshoy Veliamif (or Maltsevy)  and Malyy Veliamif  are located only about 2 km south of Pilamif.
Bolshoy Choma, also known as Bolshoy Chome, (Остров Большой Чома) , and Maly Choma , are located closer to the coast, southwest of Pilamif.
Chakmut Island  is located off the group further south down the coast.
Uyuzyut  is totally detached from the group and lies about 40 km north of the main cluster of islands, very close to a coastal landhead.

Ecology
These small islands are a home for a great variety of seabirds.

References

External links
 Travel data
 325k Satellite view
 Khabarovsk Krai

Islands of the Sea of Okhotsk
Archipelagoes of the Pacific Ocean
Islands of the Russian Far East
Archipelagoes of Khabarovsk Krai
Uninhabited islands of Russia